Allison is a Mexican rock band from Mexico City, Mexico that formed in 2002. Nominated for the Latin Grammy Awards in 2013.

History
The band was started Erik Canales and Manuel Avila in 2002.  They had known each other in high school for reasons other than music, and had individual musical projects before founding Allison, but none of these were successful, so they decided to create Allison along with two former members of a band Erik was in.
Erik says he suggested the name after reading a poem about the true meaning of love: "Allison is the girl you're falling in love with and she with you, but still you don't know her".

In 2003 they met Paco Zepeda, their current manager, and started working on demos and songs to present to some transnational labels. Their manager presented the project to the executives of Sony/BMG and they decided to sign them. From December 2005 to mid-February 2006, their debut album was recorded. The album production was conducted by Armando Ávila, Paco Erick Zepeda and Spartacus; vocal direction was conducted by Guido Laris.

At that time, they did not have a drummer, drums were recorded by Roy Cañedo, of Thermo. The mastering was conducted by Don Tayler who had previously worked with bands like Korn and Jimmy Eat World.

From 2006 to mid-2007 they worked on recording new songs including the special edition of their eponymous debut album "Allison", this new edition will appoint "Allison, Special Edition", which follows the sixth single "Amor Eterno" a Juan Gabriel cover.

In January 2008 the band recorded their second studio album, "Memorama" which was put on sale 5 May of that year.

In 2010 Manolin traveling on the highway to Oaxaca, at the height of Pinotepa Nacional, a car at high speed in reverse, rammed the car of the band and he suffered a car accident that stopped his career for a short period of time, bassist, and founding member of Allison was impaled by a piece of metal which was turned 3 times, the driver of the car that committed the hit and run fled abandoning their car on the highway. In 2014 Manolin left the band to concentrate on a new musical project Dolores de Huevos.

On 1 October they released their third studio album, "120 Km / hr", marking their return. On 9 October that same year they released their first single "16" and began their first tour of the album called  120 km / h UnderTour 2012 . They had a second tour of the album called  Come Again Tour  2013.

The band's self-titled debut album has sold more than 300,000 units sold in Mexico, being certified as platinum. The album reached number one in sales on AMPROFON and had a mainstay for 14 weeks on the chart and had a mainstay on Tower Records in Mexico City of eight weeks.

The album reached gold status in Colombia. The album has also sold in the United States of America, South America, Central America, Spain, France, Turkey, and Poland.

In 2006, Allison earned an MTV Latin American award for "Best New Artist-North", they were the closing act for the show as well. In 2006, the band was nominated for "Best Rock Group" and "Best New Group" categories for Mexican music awards OYE.

In 2007, Allison was nominated "Best Alternative Artist" for the VMA's.

Allison earned a Mexican campaign with Doritos for two months upon the release of the debut album, with a value of 25 million pesos (2,146,531 US$). They also endorse or have endorsed Gibson Guitars, Vans Mexico, Red Bull, Xbox 360, Paco Rabanne in 2007 and 2008, Jolly Rancher in 2007, and Coca-Cola in 2007.

Performances
Allison performed over 192 shows throughout Mexico during 2006. The band sold out Teatro Metropolitan with a capacity of 3,500 people in Mexico City.

Through Allison's career, the band has shared the stage with Yellowcard, Fall Out Boy, Over It, NHOI, National Product, Bring Me the Horizon, Jaguares, Paramore, Chiodos and Molotov.

Allison played eight dates of the Warped Tour 2007 and was the only Latin American band playing Warped Tour that year. The band has performed in the Southwestern United States, including San Antonio, McAllen, and El Paso. Allison played at the South by Southwest music festival in Austin, Texas in 2007 and 2008.

Members

Current members
Erik Canales – lead vocals, rhythm guitar (2002–present)
Alfie Percastegui – bass, backing vocals (2013–present)
Abraham "Fear" Jarquin – lead guitar (2005–present)
Diego Stommel – drums (2006–present)

Former members
Gabriel Arroyo – drums (2002–2004)
Juan Angeles – drums (2004–2005)
Manuel "Manolín" Ávila – bass, backing vocals (2002–2013)
Esteban Agama – lead guitar (2002–2003)
David Vidal – lead guitar (2003–2005)

Touring members
Roy Cañedo – drums (2006)

Timeline

Discography

Studio Albums
Allison (2006, released in 2007)
Memorama (2008)
120Km/h (2012)
Todo Está Encendido (2016)
EPs
Allison (2005)
Live albums
Todo Está Encendido (En Vivo desde Teatro Metropólitan) (2017)

Videography
"Frágil" (2006)
"Aquí" (2006)
"Me Cambió" (2007)
"Ya No Te Amo" (2007)
"80`s"(2007)
"Amor Eterno" (2008)
"Memorama" (2008)
"Baby Please" (2008)
"Algo que decir" (2009)
"Luna Amarga" (2013)
"Matar o Morir" (2014)
"120Km/h" (2015)
"Vamos otra vez" (2015)
"Señorita a mi me gusta su style" (2015)
"Tú" (2016)
"Miedo" (2017)
"Asesino" (2017)
"El Juego" (2018)
"El Príncipe" (2020)

References

External links
Official Web site
Official MySpace

Musical groups established in 2002
Mexican musical groups
Pop punk groups
Mexican rock music groups
Mexican alternative rock groups
Rock en Español music groups